Kanawha City is a neighborhood of the city of Charleston in Kanawha County, West Virginia, United States. It is in the southeastern part of the city, and located along WV 61 (MacCorkle Ave.) It officially starts at the 35th Street bridge, where there is a sign welcoming visitors and B&D Gastropub is located. It comprises mostly small stores and neighborhood/residential on both sides. The stores, malls, and restaurants are mostly located in the southern part of the neighborhood.

An early variant name was Owens.

During the COVID-19 pandemic, The Kanawha-Charleston Health Department reported sixteen confirmed cases and one death from COVID-19 at The Eastbrook Rehabilitation Center during the month of April 2020.

References

Geography of Charleston, West Virginia
Neighborhoods in West Virginia